Wu Hansheng (born April 1963) is a Chinese politician, currently serving as executive deputy secretary of the .

He was a representative of the 19th National Congress of the Chinese Communist Party. He is a representative of the 20th National Congress of the Chinese Communist Party and a member of the 20th Central Committee of the Chinese Communist Party.

Early life and education
Wu was born in Linqu County, Shandong, in April 1963. In 1981, he entered Jilin University of Technology (now Jilin University), where he majored in internal-combustion engine.

Political career
Wu joined the Chinese Communist Party (CCP) in June 1984.

After University in 1985, Wu became an official in the Ministry of Machine-Building Industry. In April 1991, he was despatched to the Central and State Organs Working Committee of the CCP Central Committee, and assumed various administrative and political roles there.

In January 2010, Wu was transferred to northeast China's Liaoning province and appointed vice mayor of the capital city Shenyang. In January 2013, he was admitted to member of the Standing Committee of the CCP Shenyang Municipal Committee, the province's top authority, and appointed head of the Organization Department of the CCP Shenyang Municipal Committee. He was appointed party secretary of Yingkou in September 2014 and in May 2016 was admitted to member of the Standing Committee of the CCP Liaoning Provincial Committee, the province's top authority. He also served as secretary-general of the CCP Liaoning Provincial Committee and secretary of the Working Committee of Liaoning Provincial Organs.

In March 2017, Wu was transferred to north China's Shanxi province. He was a member of the Standing Committee of the CCP Shanxi Provincial Committee, the province's top authority. He was head of the Organization Department of the CCP Shanxi Provincial Committee in March 2017, in addition to serving as president of the Provincial Party School.

In December 2018, he became deputy party secretary of the Central and State Organs Working Committee of the CCP Central Committee, rising to executive deputy secretary in May 2022.

References

1963 births
Living people
People from Linqu County
Jilin University alumni
Central Party School of the Chinese Communist Party alumni
People's Republic of China politicians from Shandong
Chinese Communist Party politicians from Shandong
Members of the 20th Central Committee of the Chinese Communist Party